Sports in Colombia includes professional sports leagues, as well as amateur leagues for numerous sports. Football, cycling, and roller skating are the most popular sports in Colombia. The Government of Colombia sponsors numerous individuals and teams nationally and internationally through the Ministry of Culture to enable sportspeople to represent Colombia in competition. The achievements of professional sportspeople are a source of national pride for Colombians.

Football

The Colombian Football Federation was founded in 1924 and has been associated with FIFA and CONMEBOL since 1936.  Colombia's national team participated in a FIFA World Cup in 1962, followed by others in 1990, 1994, 1998, 2014 and 2018. Its best presentation was in 2014, when the team reached the quarter-finals and James Rodríguez became top scorer of the tournament. The only "olympic goal" (a goal made directly from one corner shot) in the World Cup was scored for Colombia by Marcos Coll, beating legendary goalkeeper Lev Yashin in a 4–4 draw with the Soviet Union in 1962. A golden era existed for the national team from the mid-1980s towards the late 1990s when it became one of the most powerful teams in football, with a generation of talented players such as Carlos Valderrama, Andrés Escobar, René Higuita and Faustino Asprilla.

Colombia was the champion of the 2001 Copa América, which they hosted and set a new record of being undefeated, conceding no goals and winning each match. Prior to that success, they were runners-up to Peru in the 1975 Copa América. Colombia was the first team to win FIFA best mover in 1993 where the achievement was first introduced (with some help from their famous 5-0 thrashing of South American powerhouse Argentina at the qualifiers for the 1994 FIFA World Cup) and the second team after Croatia to win it twice, with the second being in 2013. Colombia also hosted the 2011 FIFA U-20 World Cup and is to host the 2016 FIFA Futsal World Cup. Colombia was organized to host the 2020 Copa América with Argentina. However, on May 20, 2020, Colombia was removed due to the 2021 Colombian protests, and Argentina was later removed due to COVID-19 issues. Brazil became the host for the cup.

The nation also qualified for the 1968, 1972, 1980, and 1992 Summer Olympics. Throughout the years, many Colombians have also worked for leagues in other nations. The national clubs compete in the Categoría Primera A, which also participates in international tournaments like Copa Libertadores de América upon winning or finishing in the first places. In club football, Atlético Nacional became the first Colombian club team to win the Copa Libertadores in 1989 and later in 2016. Once Caldas were the surprise winners of the 2004 Copa Libertadores and the second Colombian team to do so.

Cycling

Cycling in Colombia became very popular with the beginning of the annual Vuelta a Colombia race in 1951, followed by the annual Clásico RCN starting in 1961. The triumphs of Martín Emilio "Cochise" Rodríguez in European cycling competitions increased the sport's popularity, which in turn helped to develop the Colombian Cycling Federation. Rodriguez was followed by professional Colombian cyclists known as the "Colombian beetles", which include up to this date Luis "Lucho" Herrera, Luis Felipe Laverde, Fabio Parra, Víctor Hugo Peña, Santiago Botero, Mauricio Soler. The "escarabajo" (beetle) nickname was coined by radio announcer José Enrique Buitrago, while watching Ramón Hoyos climb a hill ahead of French professional racer José Beyaert during the 1955 Vuelta a Colombia.

Colombian cycling has enjoyed a renaissance in the early 2010s, with Colombian riders enjoying international success. One of the factors cited for this success has been the establishment of the 4-72 Colombia cycling team (formerly known as Colombia es Pasión-Café de Colombia), which has developed several cyclists who have gone on to compete for UCI Worldteams. The government-backed Colombia-Coldeportes cycling team competed at the 2013 Giro d'Italia, and was the first all-Colombian team to do so for 21 years. The team aimed to secure UCI ProTeam status and compete in the Tour de France, however the team announced its disbanding in October 2015 due to the withdrawal of financial support from Coldeportes, the Colombian government's sports ministry. Riders who graduated to the UCI World Tour from the team included Esteban Chaves and Darwin Atapuma. High-profile riders emerging in this period include Nairo Quintana, Rigoberto Urán, Sergio Henao, Carlos Betancur and Mariana Pajón. The two main strongholds of the sport in Colombia are the Altiplano Cundiboyacense in the centre of the country and Antioquia in the west, both being mountainous regions.

During the 1990s, the government of the Colombian capital, Bogotá introduced the Ciclovía, which became popular and were introduced later into other Colombian cities. The government of Bogotá later built Bogotá's Bike Paths Network to sponsor the practice of sports by the population and to curb the city's increasing pollution by drivers. The network extends throughout the city with bicycle use increasing five times in the city. There is an estimated 300,000 to 400,000 trips made daily in Bogotá by bicycle.

Champions
 María Luisa Calle, bronze medal winner in the 2004 Summer Olympics in Athens and World Champion.
 Fabio Parra, 3rd place in the tour de France, 1988
 Santiago Botero, Time trial world champion
 Martín Emilio "Cochise" Rodríguez, Hour world record holder and world champion in 4,000 m pursuit.
 Marlon Pérez, Youth World Champion in the points race, 1994
 Efraín Domínguez, Double world record in kilometer and 200 m pushed 1987
 Luis "Lucho" Herrera, "El jardinerito", Champion of the Dauphiné Libéré (1988, 1991) and Vuelta a España (1987), first non-European to win the Tour de France Mountains classification (1985)
 Martín Ramírez, Champion Dauphiné Libéré 1984
 Alfonso Flórez Ortiz, Champion Tour de l'Avenir 1980
 Víctor Hugo Peña, one of only three Colombian cyclists to have ever worn the yellow jersey in the Tour de France (2003).
 Rigoberto Urán, silver medal winner in the Men's Olympic Road Race, 2012 Summer Olympics, second place in the Giro d'Italia (2013, 2014), second place in the Tour de France (2017).
Mariana Pajón, gold medal winner at the 2012 Summer Olympics in the women's BMX event, gold medal winner at the 2016 Summer Olympics in the women's BMX event.
Carlos Oquendo, bronze medal winner at the 2012 Summer Olympics in the men's BMX event.
Nairo Quintana, 2nd place overall in the Tour de France, 2013, 1st place overall Tour of the Basque Country, 2013, 1st place overall Vuelta a Burgos, 2013, 1st place overall Giro d'Italia 2014, winner of Tirreno–Adriatico 2015, 1st place overall Vuelta a España 2016.
Edwin Ávila, double track cycling world champion in the points race (2011,2014).
Esteban Chaves, second place in the Giro d'Italia (2016)
Carlos Ramirez placed third at the  2016 Summer Olympics in men's BMX
Iván Sosa, 1st place overall in the 2018 Vuelta a Burgos 
Fernando Gaviria wearer of the Yellow Jersey in the 2018 Tour de France
Egan Bernal winner of the general and youth classifications in the 2019 Tour de France and 2021 Giro d'Italia

Martial arts

Boxing
Professional boxing in Colombia is mostly practiced in Caribbean region and the Pacific Region. Boxing in Colombia was also introduced by Europeans in the late 19th century and became popular in Latin America in the early 20th century, and in Colombia became popular in the 1960s, with the triumphs of Antonio "Kid Pambele" Cervantes who became a two time world Jr. Welterweight champion. He was then followed by boxers like Prudencio Cardona, Rodrigo Valdéz, Fidel Bassa, and many more. The success of these boxers created a fan base and many Colombians started to follow the sport. The National Boxing Commission of Colombia (Comisión Nacional de Boxeo de Colombia) was created and regulated the practice of boxing in Colombia.

In the 1980s, the success of Miguel "Happy" Lora reigned in the bantam weight division (118 pounds) -WBC- from 1985 to 1988 and the silver medal in the Pan American Games of Carlos José Tamara. Another boxers have figured internationally and won some titles such as Ener Julio, Joel Julio, among others.

During the 1990s, surged Irene "Mambaco" Pacheco who became a world champion in the IBF Flyweight category, and in the 2000s, Fulgencio Zúñiga current IBO Super middleweight champion, recently, Yuberjen Martinez won the silver medal in Rio 2016.

Champions
 Tomas Molinares, World Boxing champion, welter jr division (WBA) 1988
 Prudencio Cardona, World Boxing champion, light division 1982 (WBC)
 Ricardo cardona, World Boxing champion
 Elvis Álvarez, World Boxing champion, light division 1989–1990 (WBO), 1991 (WBA)
 Irene Pacheco, World Boxing champion FIB, fly division 1999
 Kermin Guardia, World Boxing champion OMB, minimum division
 Beibis Mendoza, World Boxing champion AMB, minifly division
 Camilo el "Bambino" García, World Boxing champion FIB, fly division 1992
 Daniel Reyes, World Boxing champion FIB, minimum division
 Rodrigo Valdéz WBC Middleweight Champion, Undisputed World Middleweight Champion
 Luis "Chicanero" Mendoza, World Boxing champion
 Jorge Eliecer Julio, World Boxing champion and Bronze medal 1988 Olympic Games
 Mauricio Pastrana, World Boxing champion
 Antonio Cervantes "Kid" Pambelé, World Boxing champion, welter jr
 Miguel "Happy" Lora, World Boxing champion, 1985 until 1988 (WBC)
 Fidel Bassa, World Boxing champion, light division 1987–1989 (WBA)
 Rafael "Derby" Pineda, Campeón Mundial de Boxeo Welter jr
 Ener Julio, World Boxing champion, welter jr
 Edison Miranda
 Carlos Maussa, World Boxing champion, welter jr
 Miguel "Huracán" Barrera, World Boxing champion FIB, minimum division
 Miguel "Mascara" Maturana, World Boxing champion Aficionado rooster division, Montreal, Canadá 1981
 Joel Julio
 Robinsón Pitalúa
 Clemente Rojas, bronze medal, 1972 Summer Olympics
 Alfonso Pérez, bronze medal, 1972 Summer Olympics
 Jorge Julio Rocha, bronze medal, 1988 Summer Olympics
 Yuberjen Martinez, silver medal, 2016 Summer Olympics
 Rubén "Huracán" Palacios, World Boxing champion, feather division OMB
 Juan Urango, World Boxing champion, super light division FIB

Roller skating

With the introduction of inline skates in Colombia during the 1990s, roller skating became widely practiced throughout most of the main cities in the country. It was mostly popular in the main and medium size cities such as Cartagena, Cali, Bogotá, Pasto, Barrancabermeja, Barranquilla, Medellín, and Valledupar.

Colombia is a hub for roller skaters. The national team is a perennial powerhouse at the World Roller Speed Skating Championships and has won the overall title nine times in the past 12 years. Colombia also exports state-of-the-art technology in this sport.

Notable

 Claudia Ruizm Female Inline speed skating world champion 300 meters, 1990
 Luz Mery Tristan, Female Inline speed skating world champion 5,000 meters, 1990
 Guillermo Leon Botero, Inline speed skating world champion 20,000 meters, 1990
 Luis Eduardo Moreno, Inline speed skating world champion in China, 300 meters
 Liana Holguín, Female Inline speed skating world champion in China
 Andrés Felipe Muñoz, 15,000 meters Inline speed skating Junior world champion in Abruzzo, 2004 in China 2005
 Brigitte Méndez, Female Inline speed skating world champion, 15.000 m elimination, Abruzzo (Italy) 2004, Sushou (China) 2005, 1.000 m line Sushou (China) 2005
 Juan Nayib Tobón, Multiple World champion Inline speed skating in China
 Silvia Natalia Niño, Multiple Inline speed skating world champion
 Diego Rosero, Multiple Inline speed skating world champion
 Cecilia Baena, Female Inline speed skating world champion
 Berenice Moreno, Female Inline speed skating world champion
 Jorge Botero, Inline speed skating world champion
 Jennifer Caicedo, Female Inline speed skating world champion, 500 meters Duisburg (Germany), and Suzhou (China), and in Barquisimeto (Venezuela)
 Edwin Guevara, Inline speed skating world champion, 1996, 1998
 Anderson Ariza, Inline speed skating world champion, 2002
 Alexandra Vivas, Female Inline speed skating world champion, 10,000 meters (Italy) 2004
 Nelson Garzon, Inline speed skating world champion, 10,000 meters points, 2006
 Jersy Puello, Inline speed skating world champion, 200 m and 1.000 m (Italy) 2004
 Carolina Upegui, Inline speed skating world champion, 15,000 meters (Italy) 2004
 Kelly Martinez, Inline speed skating junior world champion, 15,000 meters  Barquisimeto (Venezuela) 2003
 Jorge Cifuentes, Inline speed skating junior world champion, 1.000 m, 500 m J (Italy) 2004
 Martin Cardenas, National Skating Champion 100 m child (Colombia) 2003.
 Sara Vallejo World Figure Skating Champion Youth 200 m (Colombia) 2007.
 Maria Claudia salazar skating 15,000 m Youth 2007
 Ahmed Hamed 300 m skating world Champion Palestina youth 2007

Motorsports

 Roberto Guerrero, former Formula One and Indycar driver
 Martin Cardenas, 250cc Grand Prix motorcycle racing rider.
 Yonny Hernández, MotoGP Grand Prix motorcycle racing rider.

Juan Pablo Montoya has been the most successful sportsman in motorsports in Colombia, with a career in the CART (for which he won the 1999 championship), Formula One and of 2006 in the NASCAR, United States.

Basketball

Colombia hosted the 1982 Basketball World Cup, one of the most watched events the country has ever hosted. Since then, the country's basketball team has declined a bit. Throughout the decades, Colombia produced several internationally recognized players such as Juan Palacios, who has played in several of Europe's elite competitions and Braian Angola who recently became the first Colombian player Drafted in the NBA.

Chess
 Miguel Cuéllar
 Boris de Greiff
 Ilse Guggenberger
 Luis Augusto Sánchez
 Alonso Zapata, Finished Second Youth World Championship 1977, Great Internacional Masters.

Athletics

 Caterine Ibargüen, Athlete, Gold medal at the 2016 Summer Olympics, silver medal in the 2012 Summer Olympics, two gold medals in the IAAF World Championships in Athletics, and two gold medals in the 2011 Pan American Games and 2015 Pan American Games.
 Ximena Restrepo, Athletic runner, Bronze medal, 1992 Olympic Games
Luis Fernando López, athlete, bronze medal at the 2011 World Championship in 20 km race walking
Anthony Zambrano is a sprinter who won silver medals at the 2020 Olympic Games and the 2019 World Athletics Championships in the 400m.
Sandra Arenas won a silver medal in the Women's 20 kilometres walk at the 2020 Olympic Games.

Baseball

 Liga Colombiana de Béisbol Profesional
 Colombia, Baseball World Cup Champions 1947, 1965
 Colombia Gold medal Bolivarian Games in Lima, Peru, 1947
 Colombia Gold medal Central American and Caribbean Games in Barranquilla, 1946
 Orlando Ramírez, Major League Baseball
 Jackie Gutiérrez, Major League Baseball player
 Jolbert Cabrera, Major League Baseball player
 Orlando Cabrera, Major League Baseball player (Champion 2004 World Series with Boston Red Sox).
 Luis Castro, Major League Baseball player
 Édgar Rentería, Major League Baseball player (Champion 1997 World Series with Florida Marlins and 2010 World Series with San Francisco Giants).
 Emiliano Fruto, Major League Baseball player, pitcher Seattle Mariners
 Ernesto Frieri, Major League Baseball player, pitcher Los Angeles Angels of Anaheim

Bowling
 Jairo Ocampo, Bowling World Champion, 1974
 Armando Mariño, Bowling World Champion, 1983
 Clara Juliana Guerrero, Female Bowling World Champion, 2003, 2006, and 2009
 Luz Adriana Leal, bronze medal at the 1995 World Championship
 Sara Vargas, World Ranking Masters Champion
 Paola Gómez, bronze medal at the 2011 World Championship
 Andrés Gómez, Professional title holder
Manuel Otalora, World Games Champion in 2009
Anggie Ramírez, World Games Silver medalist in 2009 and 2013 Ibero-American Champion
Laura Fonnegra, Gold Medalist at the 2010 World Youth Championship
Santiago Mejía, Pan American Gold Medalist
Juan Francisco Gómez, Pan-American Gold Medalist
Juliana Franco Arango, Bronze medal at the 2012 World Youth Championship and Pan-American Gold Medalist

Golf
Currently, Camilo Villegas is the most recognized Colombian golfer in the world. He has been a PGA Tour professional in the United States since 2006. In 2008, Villegas was the first PGA Tour player in 11 years to win his first two PGA Tour events back-to-back. He is currently among the top 10 ranked golfers in the world, according to the Official World Golf Rankings.

Marisa Baena was the inaugural champion of the HSBC Women's World Match Play Championship in 2005.

Camilo Benedetti, Diego Vanegas, and Manuel "Manny" Villegas (the younger brother of Camilo Villegas) are currently playing professional golf in the United States on the Nationwide Tour, with hopes of eventually graduating to the PGA Tour. David Vanegas is playing on the equivalent Challenge Tour with the prospect of promotion to the European Tour.

Weightlifting

 María Isabel Urrutia, female weightlifter, multiple times world champion and gold medal, 2000 Olympic Games
 Óscar Figueroa, male weightlifter, Figueroa won Olympic Gold at the 2016 Summer Olympics, silver medal winner at the 2012 Olympic Games, silver medal winner at the 2006 Santo Domingo, gold medal winner at the 2008 Callao 
 Mabel Mosquera, female weightlifter, bronze medal, 2004 Olympic Games
 Diego Fernando Salazar, male weightlifter, silver medal, 2008 Olympic Games

Olympic wrestling
 Albeiro García, World Champion Greco-Roman wrestling, Stockholm, 1980
 Joselio Mosquera, World Champion Greco-Roman wrestling
 Jackeline Rentería – 2008 and 2012 Olympics – Women's Freestyle – Bronze – 55 kg

Rugby league
Although Rugby league is a minor sport in Colombia they have a national team.

Tennis
 Santiago Giraldo, professional tennis player
 Alejandro Falla, professional tennis player
 Juan Sebastián Cabal, professional tennis player
 Robert Farah Maksoud, professional tennis player
 Mauricio Hadad, professional tennis player
 Fabiola Zuluaga, female professional tennis player
 Catalina Castaño, female professional tennis player
Mariana Duque, Female Professional tennis player (as of 2016 current no.1 female tennis player in Colombia)

Shooting
 Helmut Bellingrodt, Shooting world champion, 1972, 1984 Olympic Games
 Bernardo Tovar, Automatic pistol world champion in Moscow 1990 and seven-time champion of in pistol, fast shooting, and automatic pistol.

Winter sports
The skating federation has started to develop ice sports, including bandy, ice hockey, short track and speed skating

Tejo
Tejo is the national sport of Colombia.

Beach volleyball
Colombia featured a women's national team in beach volleyball that competed at the 2018–2020 CSV Beach Volleyball Continental Cup.

Climbing 

Colombia is also a popular destination for technical rock climbing, with opportunities for bouldering, sport climbing, trad climbing and a mix of styles. The town of Suesca is surrounded by established rock climbs and draws climbers from all over the world.

Athletes in other sports

 Yuri Alvear, female judoka, Bronze medal winner at 2012 Olympic Games, 3 time World Champion
 Óscar Muñoz, taekwondoka, Bronze medal winner at 2012 Olympic Games
 Orlando Duque, High Diving World Champion
 Natalia Sánchez, archer, World Championship bronze medalist
 Mauricio Rivas, fencer, World Championship bronze medalist

Medals by Games 
 As of the 2019 Parapan American Games

Global Games

Regional Games

Sub Regional Games

Inter Regional Games

See also
 Colombia at the Olympics

References